Colette Goossens (born 2 June 1942) is a Belgian former swimmer. She competed in the women's 200 metre breaststroke at the 1956 Summer Olympics.

References

External links
 

1942 births
Living people
Belgian female breaststroke swimmers
Olympic swimmers of Belgium
Swimmers at the 1956 Summer Olympics
Sportspeople from Roubaix